Gendarmerie Nationale Basketball Club, commonly known as GNBC, is a Malagasy basketball club based in Antsirabe, Vakinankaratra. The team plays in the Malagasy N1A and played in the inaugural season of the Basketball Africa League (BAL). Established in 2012, the team has won its national championship twice.

History
The public sports institution GNBC was established in 2012. In September 2019, GNBC grabbed the N1A title after edging COSPN in the final. As national champions, GNBC played in the first round of the qualifying tournament of the Basketball Africa League (BAL). In the first round, the team finished second in its group and advanced to the second round. On 21 December 2019, GNBC qualified for the inaugural BAL season, after surprisingly beating Ferroviário Maputo in the semi-finals.

In the inaugural season of the BAL, GNBC played in Group A and lost all three games to Patriots BBC, Rivers Hoopers and US Monastir.

Honours
N1A
Winners (2): 2016, 2019

Malagasy President's Cup
Winners (3): 2016, 2018, 2022

 N1A Western Conference Cup
Winners (1): 2022

Indian Ocean Club Championships
Runners-up (2): 2016, 2017

Players

Current roster
The following is the GNBC roster for the 2021 BAL season:

References

Basketball teams in Madagascar
Basketball Africa League teams
Basketball teams established in 2012
Vakinankaratra
Road to BAL teams